Rief is a surname. Notable people with the surname include:

 Josef Rief (born 1960), German politician 
 Winfried Rief (born 1959), German psychologist

See also
 Riem (name)